Punel (also Romanized as Pūnel; also known as Pūnīl) is a village in Khoshabar Rural District, in the Central District of Rezvanshahr County, Gilan Province, Iran. At the 2006 census, its population was 2,347, in 580 families.

References 

Populated places in Rezvanshahr County